Oxylamia binigrovitticollis is a species of beetle in the family Cerambycidae. It was described by Stephan von Breuning  in 1969.

References

Lamiini
Beetles described in 1969